Da is a letter of related and vertically oriented alphabets used to write Mongolic and Tungusic languages.

Mongolian language 

Transliterated into Cyrillic with the letter .
When it must be distinguished from  medially, it can be written twice, and with both medial forms (as in   'well', compared with   'holy'). Alternatively, a dot is sometimes used to the right of the letter in 19th and 20th century manuscripts.
 The belly-tooth-shaped form is used before consonants (syllable-final), the other before vowels.
 Derived from Old Uyghur taw (initial, belly-tooth-shaped medial, and final) and lamedh (other medial form).
(As in   /  ,   /  , or   /  ).
 Produced with  using the Windows Mongolian keyboard layout.
 In the Mongolian Unicode block,  comes after  and before .

Notes

References 

Articles containing Mongolian script text
Mongolic letters
Mongolic languages
Tungusic languages